Brian Harelimana (born December 16, 1995) is a Rwandan-born Canadian football linebacker for the Montreal Alouettes of the Canadian Football League (CFL). He played U Sports football for the Montreal Carabins and was a fourth round draft pick by the Alouettes in 2020.

Early life and education
Harelimana was born on December 16, 1995, in Rwanda. His family moved to Canada when he was young, and Harelimana attended Vanier High School. He played U Sports football for Montreal, ranking second on the team with 37 tackles in 2019.

Professional career
Harelimana was selected in the fourth round (33rd overall) of the 2020 CFL Draft by the Montreal Alouettes. He appeared in eight games during the season, making five total tackles. He recorded two tackles on defense, three on special teams.

Personal life
His brother, Kean Harelimana, had a brief stint in the CFL with the Ottawa Redblacks.

References

External links
Montreal Alouettes profile

1995 births
Living people
Canadian football linebackers
Montreal Carabins football players
Montreal Alouettes players